ESO 325-G004 is an elliptical galaxy located approximately 416 million light-years away in the constellation Centaurus.

References 

Elliptical galaxies
 
ESO objects